Kander may refer to:is an Albanian village

Rivers
Kander (Switzerland)
Kander (Germany)

People with the surname
Jason Kander (born 1981), American politician
John Kander (born 1927), American composer of the songwriting team Kander and Ebb
Lizzie Black Kander (1858-1941), American writer and activist
Nadav Kander (born 1961), British photographer
Simon Kander (1848-1931), American politician

See also
Chander
Sander (disambiguation)
Xander (disambiguation)
Zander (disambiguation)